Olivier Lacoste-Lebuis (born August 28, 1990) is a Canadian former professional soccer player who played as a defensive midfielder.

Club career
Lacoste-Lebuis was born in Mount Royal, Quebec.

His performances for the Canada under-17 team at a tournament in Northern Ireland in 2006 attracted the interest of clubs from Germany and France. Following a trial he signed a two-year contract with RC Strasbourg in 2006.

He was named Canadian U-17 Player of the Year for 2007.

He made his single professional appearance for Strasbourg on 29 September 2008 against Clermont Foot in Ligue 2, playing the full match.

In January 2009, he joined the Maryland Terrapins of the NCAA.

International career
Lacoste-Lebuis represented Canada at the 2007 CONCACAF Under-17 Qualification Tournament in Kingston, Jamaica, Canada finished fourth in Group B.

In 2006, he captained the Canada under-17 team and was named the top player at the Ballymena Tournament in Northern Ireland.

He was also a member of the Canada U20 side. He was in the squad for the 2007 U-20 World Cup but did not make an appearance.

Personal life
The Montreal native speaks French and English.

Honours
2007: Canadian U-17 Player of the Year

References

External links
 (archive)
Federal Soccer Profile

Living people
1990 births
People from Mount Royal, Quebec
Canadian soccer players
Association football midfielders
Canada men's youth international soccer players
French Quebecers
Maryland Terrapins men's soccer players
RC Strasbourg Alsace players
Soccer people from Quebec
Canadian expatriate soccer players
Canadian expatriate sportspeople in France
Expatriate footballers in France